The Aviation Regiment 4020 was the bomber regiment of the Albanian People's Air Force.

History 
Aviation Regiment 4020 operated one Il-28 acquired in 1957 attached to 2 Skuadrilja (2nd Squadron). This aircraft was traded for an H-5, the Chinese version of the Soviet Il-28, in 1971 and retired from service in 1992.

The Aviation Regiment 4020 was Europe's last operator of the Harbin H-5. The last role the H-5 played in the Albanian Air Force was a target tug.

Inventory

Gallery

References 

Military units and formations of Albania
Air force regiments
Bomber aircraft units and formations